WBC Spartak Saint-Petersburg is a Russian women's basketball club from Saint Petersburg, competing in the Russian Women's Basketball Premier League. In 2011 the team was 8th (3rd to last).  The club is founded in 1935.

The first half of the 1970s marked the club's most successful era. Back then, Spartak won the first four editions of the Ronchetti Cup and the 1974 Soviet Championship.

After the collapse of the Soviet Union team changed its name several times. In 2004 he won the European Cup with the name Baltic star.

The Yubileyny Sports Palace serves as Spartak's home ground.

Titles
 4 Ronchetti Cups (1972 — 1975)
 1 Soviet Championship (1974)
 1 EuroCup Women (2004)

References

External links
 Official website

Women's basketball teams in Russia
Sports clubs in Saint Petersburg
EuroCup Women-winning clubs
Basketball teams established in 1935